Freeway 6 may refer to:

 Freeway 6 (Greece)
 Freeway 6 (Iran)
 Freeway 6 (Taiwan)